Kachkanar railway station is a railway station located in Kachkanar, Sverdlovsk Oblast, Russia.

History
Komsomol brigades were used to build the infrastructure, laying tracks with tractors and horses. The first steam locomotive arrived at the station on 7 November 1958. On 16 November 1958 Sverdlovsktransstroy ordered the implementation of a temporary operation department for the developing line.

The railway station buildings were opened in April 1960, and included a control room and utility rooms, with houses built nearby along Oktyabrskaya Street to accommodate railway workers. By this time the line reached from Kachkanar to Chekmen railway station. From there trains bound in the direction of Aziatskaya traversed a temporary section on the Aziatskaya -  section, 9 km from Aziatskaya. The facilities and tracks at Kachkanar were completed by April 1962, with the station building housing a ticket office and the premises of the station workers. The Aziatskaya-Kachkanar line was finally completed and entered operation on 2 April 1962.

Operations
Kachkanar is a cargo and passenger station. Kachkanar station and the neighbouring station Kachkanar-Sorting Station provides some 30% of the total volume of cargo loading of Nizhny Tagil branch of the Sverdlovsk railway.

References 

Railway stations in Sverdlovsk Oblast
Railway stations in Russia opened in 1958